The 1986–87 Chicago Blackhawks season was the 61st season of operation of the Chicago Blackhawks in the National Hockey League.

Offseason
The 1986–87 Chicago Blackhawks were coming off a year in which they won the Norris Division then somehow got swept in the first round of the playoffs by the Toronto Maple Leafs.

At the 1986 NHL Entry Draft, the Blackhawks selected forward Everett Sanipass with their first round, 14th overall pick.  Sanipass played with the Verdun Junior Canadiens of the QMJHL in the 1985–86 season, scoring 28 goals and 94 points in 67 games, while amassing 320 penalty minutes, sixth highest total in the league. Other notable players selected by the team were defenseman Frantisek Kucera and center Mike Hudson.

On August 27, the Blackhawks signed defenseman Gary Nylund to a three-year contract worth approximately $620,000.  Nylund, who would turn 23 years old early in the season, appeared in 79 games with the Toronto Maple Leafs in 1985–86, scoring two goals and 18 points while accumulating 180 penalty minutes.  In 10 playoff games, he had two assists.  The Blackhawks then sent Ken Yaremchuk, Jerome Dupont and their fourth round draft pick in the 1987 NHL Entry Draft to the Maple Leafs as compensation for signing Nylund.

Due to a back injury, defenseman Behn Wilson would miss the entire 1986–87 season.

Forward Tom Lysiak, who had been with the club since 1979, announced his retirement during the off-season.

Regular season
The Hawks struggled to start off the season, posting a record of 4-12-5 in their first 21 games, as the club was fighting with the Minnesota North Stars for the fourth and final playoff position in the Norris Division.  The Blackhawks would continue to slide to a record of 8-17-6 after 31 games, putting them in last place.  The team broke out of their season long slump, winning nine of their next 12 games, putting their record to 17-20-6, and into a tie for first place in the Norris Division with 40 points.  The Blackhawks would continue to hover just under the .500 mark, peaking at two games under with a 27-29-10 record following a four-game winning streak in March, sitting in second place in the division.  A late season slump brought the Hawks final record to 29-37-14, earning 72 points and third place in the division, as they qualified for the post-season for the 18th consecutive season.  Their 72 points was their lowest total since the 1983-84, when the Hawks finished with 68 points.

Offensively, Chicago was led by Denis Savard, who in 70 games, scored 40 goals and 90 points.  Wayne Presley, in his first full NHL season, broke out with 32 goals, which was the second highest total on the team, while earning 61 points in 80 games.  Steve Larmer had 28 goals, 84 points and a team high +20 rating in 80 games.  Troy Murray scored 28 goals and 71 points in 77 games.  Al Secord managed to score 29 goals and 58 points in 77 games while leading the Hawks with 196 penalty minutes, and Ed Olczyk had a disappointing season by his standards, scoring 16 goals and 51 points in 79 games.

On defence, Doug Wilson led the way with 16 goals and 48 points in 69 games.  Bob Murray scored six goals and 44 points in 79 games, while newcomer, Gary Nylund had seven goals and 27 points, as well as 190 penalty minutes, in 80 games.

In goal, Bob Sauve played the majority of the minutes, going 19-19-5 with a 3.59 GAA and a .894 save percentage, while earning the only shutout the club had during the season in 46 games.  Murray Bannerman backed him up, and had a 9-18-8 record with a 4.14 GAA and a .873 save percentage in 39 games.

Final standings

Schedule and results

Playoffs

Detroit Red Wings 4, Chicago Blackhawks 0
The Blackhawks opened the 1987 Stanley Cup Playoffs against the Detroit Red Wings.  The Red Wings finished the 1986-87 season with a record of 34-36-10, earning 78 points and second place in the Norris Division, which was six more points than the third place Blackhawks.

The series opened at Joe Louis Arena in Detroit, Michigan, as Bob Sauve got the nod in goal.  The Red Wings opened the scoring early in the first period on a goal by Petr Klima, and they would extend their lead to 2-0 after a goal by Darren Veitch before the first intermission.  After a scoreless second period, Bob Murray got the Blackhawks to within one after scoring midway through the third period.  The Red Wings Shawn Burr then scored just a little over two minutes later, as Detroit held on for a 3-1 victory.

In the second game, the Red Wings again scored early, as Gerard Gallant scored only 37 seconds into the game, giving the Wings a 1-0 lead.  Joey Kocur extended the Detroit lead to 2-0 midway through the period.  In the second period, Steve Yzerman made it 3-0 for the Red Wings before Marc Bergevin replied for the Blackhawks, cutting the Wings lead to 3-1.  Detroit restored their three-goal lead on a Shawn Burr goal, making it 4-1 for the Red Wings after two periods.  In the third period, Adam Oates capped off the scoring for Detroit, as they cruised their way to a 5-1 victory and a 2-0 series lead.  The Red Wings defence held the Blackhawks to only 15 shots in the game.

The series moved to Chicago Stadium for the third game of the series.  In the first period, the Red Wings again opened the scoring, as Steve Yzerman beat goaltender Bob Sauve, giving Detroit a 1-0 lead 5:28 into the game.  A minute later, the Red Wings Mel Bridgman made it 2-0.  Bridgman added another goal in the final minute of the period, as the Wings took a 3-0 lead.  The Blackhawks scored the only goal of the second period, as Denis Savard scored 2:23 into the period, cutting the Wings lead to 3-1 heading into the third.  Only 21 seconds into the third period, the Hawks Curt Fraser scored, as the Hawks were within a goal, down 3-2.  Late in the period, Ed Olczyk scored the tying goal, as the Hawks sent the game into overtime.  In the extra period, the Wings Shawn Burr scored his third goal in three games, as Detroit defeated Chicago 4-3, and took a 3-0 series lead.

The Blackhawks stayed with Bob Sauve in goal for the fourth game, and for the fourth time in the series, the Wings scored first, as Brent Ashton scored midway through the first period for a 1-0 Red Wings lead.  In the second period, Mel Bridgman scored only 35 seconds into the period, as Detroit took a 2-0  lead in the game.  Wayne Presley got the Blackhawks on the board with a goal at 9:26 of the period, however, the Red Wings Dave Barr scored 41 seconds later, restoring Detroit's two-goal lead.  In the third period, the Hawks fired 18 shots at Red Wings goaltender Greg Stefan, however, they could not score, and the game finished with the Wings winning 3-1, and sweeping the series 4 games to 0.  Stefan was the star of the game for the Red Wings, making 46 saves.

Player stats

Regular season
Scoring

Goaltending

Playoffs
Scoring

Goaltending

Note: Pos = Position; GP = Games played; G = Goals; A = Assists; Pts = Points; +/- = plus/minus; PIM = Penalty minutes; PPG = Power-play goals; SHG = Short-handed goals; GWG = Game-winning goals
      MIN = Minutes played; W = Wins; L = Losses; T = Ties; GA = Goals-against; GAA = Goals-against average; SO = Shutouts; SA = Shots against; SV = Shots saved; SV% = Save percentage;

Awards and records

Transactions

Draft picks
Chicago's draft picks at the 1986 NHL Entry Draft held at the Montreal Forum in Montreal, Quebec.

Farm teams

See also
1986–87 NHL season

References

2. 1987-88 Chicago Blackhawks Yearbook (official team publication)

External links
 

Chic
Chic
Chicago Blackhawks seasons
Chicago
Chicago